The Kingdom of Dyfed, one of several Welsh petty kingdoms that emerged in 5th-century sub-Roman Britain in southwest Wales, was based on the former territory of the Demetae (modern Welsh Dyfed). The medieval Irish narrative, The Expulsion of the Déisi, attributing the kingdom's founding to Eochaid, son of Artchorp, being forced across the Irish sea, in the 5th century; his descendants founding the line of the kings of Dyfed, down to "Tualodor mac Rígin" (Tudor map Regin). The  Normans invaded Wales (1067 to 1100), and by 1138 incorporated Dyfed into a new shire called Pembrokeshire after the Norman castle built in the Cantref of Penfro and under the rule of the  Marcher Earl of Pembroke.

History

In the year 360, a sudden series of coordinated raids by the Irish, Anglo-Saxons and Picts began. These continued as the Irish colonised the Isle of Man, and resulted in a short period lasting until the 5th century during which Old Irish was spoken in the region: twenty stones dated to this period have ogham inscriptions. One bilingual Latin-Irish stone in Castelldwyran, near Narberth, has the name Votecorigas written on it; the wordier Latin inscription is Memoria Voteporigis Protictoris, giving him the title "protector", a late Imperial Roman title given to nobility.

Dyfed may have originally occupied the area that bordered the rivers Teifi, Gwili and Tywi, and included contemporary Pembrokeshire, the western part of contemporary Carmarthenshire, and with the town of Carmarthen.

During times of strength, the kingdom expanded to additionally cover the Ystrad Tywi ("Valley of the Tywi"), including Cydweli and Gwyr (possibly under the reign of Aergol Lawhir), and even bordered Brycheiniog. Dyfed lost the Ystrad Tywi region to Ceredigion, another petty kingdom, in the late 7th century.

Parochia
During the "Age of the Saints", Dyfed may have had as many as seven bishops, called in Latin sacerdotes one for each cantref; their sees were called parochia. However, by the High Middle Ages the Diocese of St David's emerged as one of only three episcopal dioceses in Wales, with St. David's covering all of West Wales and part of Mid Wales.

Dyfed was subject to extensive raids during the Viking Age between the 8th and 11th centuries, causing social and political instability, and with the Vikings establishing settlements in southern Dyfed. By the latter part of the 9th century, the rulers of Dyfed had grown cautious of the influence of the sons of Rhodri the Great, and sought out an alliance and the patronage of Alfred the Great of England.  Historical attempts have been made to cast the relationship as one as a confederation of Christian unity on the isle of Britain, under the leadership of Alfred, against the heathen Danes. However, there evolved a significant degree of coercion in the relationship, according to Davies. "The recognition by Welsh rulers that the king of England had claims upon them would be a central fact in the subsequent political history of Wales," according to Davies.

In about 904, Dyfed's ruler, Llywarch ap Hyfaidd, died, leaving his daughter Elen ferch Llywarch (893-943) as his heiress.  Elen was married to Hywel Dda, ruler of neighbouring Seisyllwg and grandson of Rhodri the Great through his second son, Cadell ap Rhodri. Through his marriage to Elen, Hywel incorporated Dyfed into an enlarged realm to be known as Deheubarth, meaning the "south part", and later went on to conquer Powys and Gwynedd. However, both Powys and Gwynedd returned to their native dynasties on Hywel's death in 950. Hwyel's grandson Maredudd ab Owain recreated the kingdom of his grandfather, but his rule was beset with increasing Viking raids during the latter part of the 10th century. It is during this period that Viking settlements increased, particularly in the area in the cantref of Penfro, with other Viking settlements and trading station at Haverfordwest, Fishguard and Caldey Island in Dyfed. Viking raids upon the Welsh were "relentless", according to Davies, and Maredudd was compelled to raise taxes to pay the ransoms for Welsh hostages in 993, and in 999 a Viking raiding party attacked St. David's and killed Morganau, the bishop.

Dyfed remained an integral province within Deheubarth until the Norman invasions of Wales between 1068-1100. In the Dyfed region, the cantrefi of Penfro, Rhos, Cemais and Pebidiog became occupied by Norman overlords. The Normans influenced the election of the Bishops of St. David's, in Pebidiog, from 1115 onwards. The Princes of Deheubarth, and later Llywelyn the Great as the Prince of a virtual Principality of Wales from 1216, fought to recover the region until the Conquest of Wales by Edward I in 1284 settled the matter. The 1284 Statute of Rhuddlan established the English counties of Pembrokeshire and Carmarthenshire out of the region formally known as Dyfed.

Archaeology
Archaeological evidence and theories from this period (as well as prior and post-Kingdom) are dealt with in depth by Dyfed Archaeological Trust.

Modern times

In 1974 an administrative area was established in south west Wales called Dyfed, incorporating Pembrokeshire, Cardiganshire and Carmarthenshire; this was broken up in 1996, though preserved for some ceremonial purposes, and survives in the names of some regional organisations, such as Dyfed–Powys Police & Dyfed Telecom.

See also
Déisi
Pwyll Pendefig Dyfed

References

Bibliography

Further reading
 The Irish settlements in Wales, Myles Dillon, Celtica 12, 1977, p. 1-11.

920 disestablishments
Dyfed
Dyfed
History of Pembrokeshire
410s establishments